Go for Your Guns is the fifteenth album by the Isley Brothers. Released on April 16, 1977, on their T-Neck label, it was also the band's fifth album to be distributed by their deal with Epic. Released in mid-April 1977, the album peaked a month later at  1 on Billboard  Top Soul chart, and at  6 on the Billboard 200.

The album was remastered and expanded for inclusion in the 2015 released CD box set The RCA Victor & T-Neck Album Masters, 1959–1983.

Overview

Recording
After four albums that were assisted by producers Malcolm Cecil and Robert Margouleff in California, the Isley Brothers decided to stay in the East Coast choosing to record at upstate New York's Bearsville Studios, not too far from the brothers' T-Neck label in neighboring New Jersey at Chris Jasper's insistence. The album was engineered by John Holbrook assisted by Tom Mark. It was mixed at Mediasound in New York City with Holbrook as mix engineer.

The album also noted Ron Isley's growing transition into singing more ballads, though he still performed lead on some of the band's funkier recordings on the album. Though they had changed their location and had some minor changes during production, most of the direction of the album remained the same as it had for other albums, with stronger emphasis on rock music as evident in the songs "Climbing Up the Ladder" and "Livin' in the Life" than they had on previous albums.

Reception

Released in 1977, the album became one of their longest-running chart successes on the album chart staying on the charts for 40 weeks and spawning several singles including "The Pride", "Livin' in the Life" and the ballad "Voyage to Atlantis" while the funk ballad "Footsteps in the Dark", which was never released as a single, became one of the brothers' most popular songs in their repertoire and would be sampled constantly, most famously by rapper Ice Cube in his hit, "It Was a Good Day". The album was certified platinum in July 1977, then eventually went double platinum by the Recording Industry Association of America (RIAA), with shipments of two million copies.

Track listing
Unless otherwise indicated, information is taken from Allmusic.com and is based on Liner notes

Personnel
The Isley Brothers
 Ronald Isley - lead vocals (1-6), background vocals
 Rudolph Isley - lead vocals (6), background vocals
 O'Kelly Isley - lead vocals (6), background vocals
 Ernie Isley - background vocals (2, 5), congas (2, 5), 12-String guitar (2, 5), electric guitar (1-2,The Isley Brothers.   "Footsteps in the Dark, Pts. 1 & 2".    YouTube: The Isley Brothers - Topic.   18 February 2017.   https://m.youtube.com/watch?v=Dyq9zlYMw9g 5), rhythm guitar, drums
 Marvin Isley - background vocals (2, 5), bass
 Chris Jasper - background vocals (2, 5), tambourine (2, 5), piano (2, 5), synthesizer (2, 5), keyboards
Guest Musician
 Everett Collins - congas (3)

Charts

Singles

See also
List of number-one R&B albums of 1977 (U.S.)

External links
 The Isley Brothers-Go For Your Guns at Discogs
 Go For Your Guns 2012

References

1977 albums
The Isley Brothers albums
T-Neck Records albums